Körpe is a village in the Elazığ District of Elazığ Province in Turkey. Its population is 205 (2021). The village is populated by both Kurds and Turks.

References

Villages in Elazığ District
Kurdish settlements in Elazığ Province